Troy A. Miller is an American law enforcement official currently serving as the Acting Commissioner of the United States Customs and Border Protection, a position he previously held between January and December 2021. From December 2021 to November 2022 he served as the Deputy Commissioner.

Education 
Miller attended Bemidji State University and earned his bachelor's degree. He also attended the senior executive fellow program of Harvard University John F. Kennedy School of Government.

Career 
Miller joined the U.S. Customs Service as a Customs Inspector in 1993. He has held numerous leadership positions, including as assistant port director in Seattle, director of Targeting and Analysis in the Office of Intelligence and Operations Coordination and director of the National Targeting Center-Passenger.

From 2013 to 2015, Miller served as the acting assistant commissioner of the Office of Intelligence and Investigative Liaison. In that position, he testified before the House Homeland Security Subcommittee on Border and Maritime Security on the threat posed by ISIL terrorists with western passports. 

Miller then served as the executive director of the CBP's National Targeting Center, the principal organization responsible for developing and implementing CBP's counterterrorism strategy, directing over 800 employees.

Miller then served as the director of field operations for CBP's New York Field Office, directing the activities of almost 3,000 CBP employees in John F. Kennedy International Airport, Newark Liberty International Airport and the Port of New York and New Jersey.

On January 20, 2021, Miller was appointed as acting commissioner of U.S. Customs and Border Protection in the Biden administration, succeeding Mark Morgan. On December 13, 2021, when the Senate-confirmed commissioner Chris Magnus was sworn in, he was appointed as the new deputy commissioner. Miller re-assumed the acting commissioner position upon Magnus's resignation on November 12, 2022.

Awards 

 Distinguished Executive Presidential Rank Award, 2016
 Meritorious Executive Presidential Rank Award, 2021

References

External links 

 

Living people
United States Department of Homeland Security officials
U.S. Immigration and Customs Enforcement officials
Trump administration personnel
Biden administration personnel
Year of birth missing (living people)
Bemidji State University alumni
Harvard University alumni